Miguel Gaudencio is a Portuguese film director and producer. He has been recruited by major international brands, such as McDonald's and Coca-Cola, to innovate their product commercials.

Career
Miguel Gaudencio directed more than 200 music videos in Portugal before reaching the age of 30. His sharp, snappy directorial style earned him many awards: Try Again won the SOL TV Music Video award for the best music video of the year in 2000.

By 2001, advertising agencies were lining up to utilise Gaudencio's talent, and he began shooting commercials for leading multi-national clients such as McDonald's, Coca-Cola and Mercedes. By 2003 Gaudencio was working across Europe. He has now directed commercials for agencies in countries including Poland, Germany, Russia, Croatia, Slovenia, Czech Republic, Bulgaria, Romania, Maroco and Tunisia.

In 2004 he directed his first short feature, The Hole, a 30-minute film that was the standout work in a ten-part Christmas-story special aired on Portuguese television. He directed his second 30-minute feature, a taught psycho-sexual thriller, Same Room Same Time, in 2006.

In 2008, Gaudencio directed his first full-length feature film, Second Life. With an international all-star celebrity cast (Piotr Adamczyk, Liliana Santos, Claudia Vieira) the film had the biggest production budget in Portuguese cinema history, and an eight-week shoot on location in Portugal and Italy. The film received rave reviews and was the most commercially successful Portuguese film in the first six months of 2009.

In 2010, he directed the first ever Polish feature documentary, Desire for Beauty, on the issues of beauty and self-perception. It follows the journeys of four people who turn to plastic surgery as the last resort in their search for perfection. Aside from the obvious dilemmas, Desire for Beauty addresses numerous hidden questions, and reveals things that neither the makers nor the heroes of the film really expected. The making of the film attracted a number of renowned members of the Polish social scene (Zbigniew Lew-Starowicz) and found solid support in the professional opinions of the country's top experts in various fields – from psychology to the fashion industry. The film stars Agata Kulesza and was released in the spring of 2013. Desire for Beauty was released worldwide in 2014 through Filmhub (Formerly Kinonation), an industry leader in VOD distribution.

Down, But Not Out! and No Excuses both feature-length documentaries (shot simultaneously during the summer of 2014) are a personal approach to the world of feminine sport. Down, But Not Out! follows four amateur women boxers as they step into the ring for the first time and No Excuses captures imagery in a Crossfit atmosphere set to a diversified selection of commentators on gender equality. Both films were expected to be available in selected cinemas and VOD outlets starting the spring of 2015.

In 2017, Gaudencio produced and directed the memoir of life as it is and of women as they are Tattoo Girls. The documentary is a female centric-film showcasing about a group of ordinary women (within a range of ages), and their different styles of daily life, showcasing their stories and the impact they have on society as real, everyday women. We are living in an era of the importance and empowerment of women throughout the world, and this documentary aims to convey ideas and topics to be felt, absorbed and discussed. The film made an excellent run on film festivals through the world, and was nominated best documentary feature by Utah Film Awards. Aside of the excellent run on worldwide film festivals Tattoo Girls was instant hit on US streaming channels gathering over 2 million views during the April 2018.

In 2019, the upcoming sport documentary of Gaudencio, Offside, which captures the commitment, passion and comradery of a female Polish football team during their gruelling, but critical pre-season training as their coach, sets the foundation for the new season ahead by pushing them to new limits. The film will be available from June 2019, after a short passage by selected theatres, on the main streaming channels (Amazon Prime/iTunes/Google Play).

Filmography

Films (features)

References

External links

Official webpage

Living people
1971 births